Burton is a settlement on the east shore of Lower Arrow Lake in the West Kootenay region of southeastern British Columbia.

Before European contact, Burton was known as Xaieken, a large village of Sinixt first nations people. Inadequate archeological research of the area exists to support several First Nations claims. Burton arose in the 1890s when gold was found at Cariboo Creek, a steamboat stop. The community was named for Reuben Burton who preempted in 1893 and was the postmaster. Arriving miners and farmers spurred development. Served by CPR sternwheeler boats for many years until 1954, BC Highway 6 is now the main means of access. Tug boats still ply the lake towing log booms and barges. 

The original townsite was submerged when the Keenleyside Dam flooded the area in 1968. A new town site was established on higher ground at that time. The old town site had four stores, gas stations, cafe, school, playing fields, a community hall, a large Federal government wharf, a hotel with a pub and three churches. The old townsite was north of the mouth of Cariboo creek with farms north, south and east of the townsite. A scenic location surrounded by mountains with lake, creeks and wildlife close at hand.

See also 
 Steamboats of the Arrow Lakes
 Burton Elementary School (Burton, British Columbia)

References 

Designated places in British Columbia
Unincorporated settlements in British Columbia
Arrow Lakes
British Columbia populated places on the Columbia River